The Little Death (known as A Funny Kind of Love in the United Kingdom) is a 2014 Australian sex comedy film written and directed by Josh Lawson. It deals with the secret lives of five suburban couples living in Sydney, revealing both the fetishes and the repercussions that come with sharing them. A Spanish remake titled Kiki, Love to Love was released in 2016.

Cast
 Bojana Novakovic as Maeve
 Damon Herriman as Dan
 Josh Lawson as Paul
 Kate Box as Rowena
 T.J. Power as Sam
 Stephanie May as Mourner
 Ben Lawson as Glenn
 Patrick Brammall as Richard
 Kate Mulvany as Evie
 Lachy Hulme as Kim
 Erin James as Monica
 Kim Gyngell as Steve

Reception
The Little Death received mixed reviews from critics and audiences, earning an approval rating of 60% on Rotten Tomatoes.

Accolades

References

External links
 
 

2014 films
2014 comedy films
2010s sex comedy films
Australian sex comedy films
Films about couples
Films scored by Michael Yezerski
Films set in Sydney
Films shot in Sydney
2010s English-language films
2010s Australian films